Asshukrie Wahid (born 27 February 1998) is a Singaporean professional footballer who plays as a forward for the Singapore Premier League side Geylang International FC.

Career statistics

Club

References

Living people
1997 births
Singaporean footballers
Association football forwards
Balestier Khalsa FC players
Geylang International FC players
Young Lions FC players
Singapore Premier League players